Cristian is a commune located in Sibiu County, Transylvania, Romania. It is composed of a single village, Cristian, located on the Cibin. The village was founded in 1223 by German settlers.

Culture and recreation
A medieval fortified church in Cristian was built in the 13th century (only the Romanesque tower survives; the main volume is from 1490s and is in Gothic style). It is surrounded by a wall with several towers. The church was declared a historic monument, as well an Orthodox church "Buna Vestire", built in 1790. There is a museum as well.

Gallery

References

Communes in Sibiu County
Localities in Transylvania